Air Vice Marshal Peter Theodore Philpott,  (20 March 1915 – 13 July 1988) was a senior Royal Air Force officer.

RAF career
Philpott was commissioned into the Royal Air Force on 27 July 1935. He served in the Second World War in the Directorate of Operational Training and then as officer commanding, RAF Horsham St Faith.

After the war he became officer commanding, RAF Deversoir in 1952, Deputy Director of Policy in 1954 and Director of Policy (Air Staff) in 1958. He went on to be Director of Joint Plans in 1960, senior member of the RAF Directing Staff at the Imperial Defence College in 1961 and Air Officer Commanding, No. 23 Group in August 1963. After that he became Head of British Defence Liaison Staff in Canberra in 1965 and Director of Service Intelligence in 1968 before retiring in 1970.

References

1915 births
1988 deaths
Royal Air Force air marshals
Companions of the Order of the Bath
Commanders of the Order of the British Empire
Royal Air Force personnel of World War II